Raoul Weckbecker (16 July 1898 – 6 October 1978) was a Luxembourgian bobsledder and skier.

He competed at the four-man bobsleigh event at the 1928 Winter Olympics, finishing twentieth (out of twenty-three). In 1936, in Garmisch-Partenkirchen, Weckbecker finished 22nd (and last) in the two-man bob competition. He also competed in the alpine skiing combined event at the 1936 Games but did not finish the downhill race.

References
1936 bobsleigh two-man results
1936 Olympic Winter Games official report. - p. 419.
COSL-ALO profile 

1898 births
1978 deaths
Luxembourgian male alpine skiers
Luxembourgian male bobsledders
Alpine skiers at the 1936 Winter Olympics
Bobsledders at the 1928 Winter Olympics
Bobsledders at the 1936 Winter Olympics
Olympic alpine skiers of Luxembourg
Olympic bobsledders of Luxembourg
People from Mersch